Angela Downey-Browne (born 1957, Kilkenny) is a retired Irish sportsperson. She played camogie at various times with her local clubs, St Paul's camogie club based in Kilkenny city and Lisdowney, and was a member of the Kilkenny senior inter-county team from 1970 until 1995. Downey is regarded as the greatest player in the history of the game.

Downey's reputation as one of the all-time greats of camogie is self-evident.  In a senior inter-county career that lasted for a quarter of a century she won twelve All-Ireland medals, thirteen Leinster medals and eight National League medals. With her two clubs St. Paul's and Lisdowney she collected a huge haul of twenty-two county titles and six All-Ireland club medals.

Downey was also presented with a number of personal awards during her career. In 1977 she was honoured with the B&I Player of the Year Award.  Almost a decade later in 1986 Downey became only the third camogie player ever to be presented with a Texaco Award. In 2004 her reputation as the greatest player of all-time was further cemented when she was named on the Camogie Team of the Century.

Biography
Angela Downey was born in Kilkenny in 1957. From a young age camogie was a central part of her life, as well as the life of her twin sister Ann. Their father Shem Downey won an All-Ireland medal with Kilkenny in 1947. Angela started playing camogie when she was nine years-old and, in time, she would go on to become one of the best players in the history of the game.

Playing career

Club
Downey played most of her club camogie with the famed St Paul’s Camogie Club, Kilkenny. When the club disbanded in the early 1990s she had already collected a huge haul of twenty county titles. During this period Downey won six All-Ireland club titles, the first of which came in 1970. She won the last of her six All-Ireland club medals nineteen years later in 1989. She later joined the Lisdowney club and enjoyed further success. Together with her twin-sister Ann she won a further two county medals.

Inter-county

Downey was just thirteen years-old when she first played senior camogie with Kilkenny in 1970.  Two years later, in 1972, she was still a member of the team when she lined out in her first championship decider. Cork provided the opposition and it was Cork who secured a 2–5 to 1–4 victory. Two years later, in 1974, Kilkenny were back in the All-Ireland final and, once again, Cork were the opponents. The game ended level with Kilkenny scoring 3–8 and Cork scoring 4–5. The replay took place a few weeks later, and another tense game ensued. Kilkenny sneaked the victory by 3–3 to 1–5 and Downey captured her first All-Ireland medal.

Kilkenny surrendered their All-Ireland crown in 1975. Downey later lined out in a third All-Ireland final in 1976. On that occasion Kilkenny took on Dublin. At the full-time whistle Kilkenny were the winners by 0–6 to 1–2. It was Downey's second All-Ireland medal.

In 1977, Downey captained Kilkenny in their quest for back-to-back All-Ireland titles.  That year she guided her county to the All-Ireland final once again.  Wexford, the winners of the championship two years earlier, provided the opposition.  Kilkenny ultimately won on a score line of 3–4 to 1–3.  Not only was it Downey's third All-Ireland medal but she also had the honour of collecting the O'Duffy Cup. She was later chosen as the B&I Player of the Year.

Kilkenny went into decline for the next few years; however, Downey added a National Camogie League medal to her collection in 1980.  It was Kilkenny's first title in that competition. In 1981, Kilkenny met Cork in the championship decider. Both sides ended the game with 3–9 apiece. IN the replay, Kilkenny won by 1–9 to 0–7 with Downey collecting a fourth All-Ireland medal.

All-Ireland success was slow in coming over the next few years; however, Downey won a second National League medal with Kilkenny in 1982. Three years later in 1985 she collected a third winners' medal in that competition. Kilkenny later qualified for another All-Ireland final. Dublin provided the opposition on that occasion. The final ended with a 0–13 to 1–5 victory for Kilkenny, giving her a fifth All-Ireland medal.

1986 saw Kilkenny line out in a second consecutive All-Ireland final, her sixth in all. For the second year in-a-row Dublin provided the opposition, however, once again the result was the same. Kilkenny won the game by 2–12 to 2–3.  It was Downey's sixth All-Ireland title. She was later presented with a  Texaco Award, thus becoming only the third camogie player ever to win one.

In 1987, Downey added a fourth National League medal to her collection after Kilkenny beat Dublin in yet another national final.  Later that year Kilkenny qualified for the All-Ireland final.  It was an historic occasion as Downey's side were hoping to capture a third All-Ireland title in-a-row, something that Kilkenny had never achieved.  Cork stood in their way. The full-time score of 3–10 to 1–7 gave Kilkenny the victory and gave Downey a seventh All-Ireland medal.

In 1988, Downey captained Kilkenny once again. She began the year by winning a fifth National League medal before later guiding her county to the All-Ireland final once again, against Cork. Kilkenny won by 4–11 to 3–8. It was Downey's eighth All-Ireland medal while she also joined an exclusive club of player that had captained their county to more than one All-Ireland victory.

In 1989, Cork were beaten in the National League final to give Kilkenny and Downey a sixth title in that competition.  The subsequent All-Ireland final was a repeat of the championship deciders of the previous two years. Cork were out to avenge those defeats and avoid losing a third All-Ireland final in-a-row, while Kilkenny were hoping to add another consecutive title to their huge collection. The result saw Kilkenny win by 3–10 to 2–6, giving Downey a ninth All-Ireland medal.

At the start of 1990, the county annexed a fourth consecutive National League title. It was Downey's seventh medal in that competition.  The subsequent All-Ireland final saw Kilkenny take on Wexford for the first time since 1977.  Kilkenny dominated the game and a final score of 1–14 to 0–7 gave Downey her tenth All-Ireland medal on the field of play, a victory which made her joint third with Kay Ryder on the all-time list of leading All-Ireland medal holders.

In 1991, Downey was captain of her native-county once again. The year started badly when Kilkenny's run of success in the National League came to an end. Cork defeated Kilkenny in the final of that competition, denying the county a fifth league title in-a-row. In spite of this defeat Downey's side later qualified for the All-Ireland final. Cork provided the opposition once again. Kilkenny won the day by 3–8 to 0–10.  Once again it was Kilkenny's success in getting goals at vital times that gave them a seventh All-Ireland title in-a-row. It was Downey's eleventh All-Ireland medal overall. She lifted the O'Duffy Cup for the third time. The team bounced back in 1993 after a decline, with Downey winning her eighth National League medal. It was 1994, however, before Downey lined out in her next All-Ireland final. Wexford, Kilkenny's nearest neighbours, provided the opposition on that occasion. A final score of 2–11 to 0–8 gave Downey her twelfth All-Ireland medal on the field of play. On the same day her sister Ann collected her eleventh medal on the field of play.  Downey was subsequently named Camogie Player of the Year.

In 1995, Downey lined out in her final championship season with Kilkenny. It was twenty-five years since she made her debut as a thirteen-year-old. For the final time she lined out to play on All-Ireland final day as Cork provided the opposition.  Kilkenny, however, were not the force that they once were. In the game, Cork emerged victorious by 4–8 to 2–10, thus, denying Downey a thirteenth All-Ireland medal. Downey retired from inter-county camogie following this defeat.

Provincial
Downey also lined out with Leinster in the Gael Linn sponsored inter-provincial camogie championship.  In all she won ten inter-provincial titles with her province.

Retirement
At the time of her retirement, Downey's haul of twelve All-Ireland medals was surpassed by only two other all-time greats, Úna O'Connor and Kathleen Mills.  In 2004, Downey was named in the left corner-forward position on a special team picked to celebrate the centenary of the Camogie Association of Ireland. Downey boycotted the presentation in protest at the absence of her sister Ann from the team. Angela is a teacher at Grennan College in Thomastown, County Kilkenny.

Teams

References

Sources

 Corry, Eoghan, The GAA Book of Lists (Hodder Headline Ireland, 2005).
 Donegan, Des, The Complete Handbook of Gaelic Games (DBA Publications Limited, 2005).
 Fullam, Brendan, Captains of the Ash, (Wolfhound Press, 2002).

1957 births
Living people
Irish schoolteachers
Kilkenny camogie players
Twin sportspeople
Irish twins
Date of birth missing (living people)